Saturnalia is the only studio album by The Gutter Twins, a collaboration between Greg Dulli and Mark Lanegan. The album, which was started as far back as 2003, was released on March 4, 2008. Prior to the album's release, the duo began posting songs on their official MySpace page. Joseph Arthur sings backing vocals on "Idle Hands." The song was also the first single, released April 14, 2008.

Music

Recording
On Christmas Day 2003, Dulli and Lanegan started recording songs which would become Saturnalia. Lanegan said "It started pretty innocently." In July 2007, Pitchfork Media announced that the band had signed to Seattle label Sub Pop; soon thereafter, the March 4, 2008 release date was set.

Saturnalia Tour
The Gutter Twins announced a UK tour in May 2008, where they played 6 live concerts around Britain. The band played Oxford Academy (August 11), Nottingham Rescue Rooms (12), London Shepherd's Bush Empire (13), Brighton, Komedia (26), Sheffield, Leadmill (27) and Liverpool, Academy 2 (30).

Track listing

Personnel 
 Greg Dulli – vocals (all songs), guitar (1, 2, 4, 5, 6, 8, 9, 11, 12), bass (1, 11), organ (1), congas (1), piano (2, 3, 9), drums (3, 9, 10, 11), organ (3), mellotron (4, 5, 6, 11, 12), Rhodes (7, 9, 10, 12)
 Mark Lanegan – vocals (all songs except 9)

Guest appearances 
 Joseph Arthur – vocals (5)
 Norm Block – drums (1, 11)
 David Catching – guitar (12)
 Scott Ford – bass (1, 2, 5, 9, 10), vocals (1, 2)
 Petra Haden – violin (9)
 Jeff Klein – guitar (2, 9, 11), organ (5), programming (11)
 Mario Lalli – bass (6), guitar (10)
 Eddie Nappi – bass (7, 12), drums (7)
 Rick G. Nelson – violin/viola/cello (5, 6)
 Quintron – organ (8)
 Andy Preen – drums/percussion (8)
 Dave Rosser – guitar (2, 5, 6, 9), vocals/bass/lap steel/organ (8), mandolin (11)
 Mathias Schneeberger – guitar (1, 3, 5, 6, 7, 10, 11), organ (1), harmonium (1, 2), bass (3, 4), drums (4), mellotron (11)
 Natasha Shneider – synthesizer/sequencer (11)
 Cully Symington – drums (5, 9)
 Martina Topley-Bird – vocals (4)
 Jen Turner – vocals (5)
 Troy Van Leeuwen – guitar (3, 4, 7)
 Simone Vitucci – cello (1, 9)
 Greg Wieczorek – drums (2, 6, 8), vocals (5), percussion (8)
 Brian Young – drums (12)

Chart positions

References

External links
 Official MySpace page

2008 albums
Albums produced by Greg Dulli
Sub Pop albums
The Gutter Twins albums